Nzérékoré is a prefecture located in the Nzérékoré Region of Guinea. The capital is Nzérékoré. The prefecture covers an area of 3,632 km.²  and has an estimated population of 396,949.

Sub-prefectures
The prefecture is divided administratively into 11 sub-prefectures:
 Nzérékoré-Centre
 Bounouma
 Gouécké
 Kobéla
 Koropara
 Koulé
 Palé
 Samoé
 Soulouta
 Womey
 Yalenzou

Towns and villages

 Alaminata
 Balimou
 Bamba
 Bana
 Bangoueta
 Bassaita
 Batoata
 Beliehouma
 Benda
 Beneouli
 Bienta
 Bilikoidougou
 Bipa
 Bohon
 Boita
 Boma
 Boo
 Bounouma
 Bowe
 Dapore
 Demou
 Din
 Diogouinta
 Diomanta
 Dorota
 Douala
 Dourouba
 Foudjou
 Gala
 Galagbaye
 Galeye
 Gambata
 Gbadiou
 Gbaeta
 Gbagoune
 Gbaya
 Gbili
 Gbonoma
 Gbote
 Gbouo
 Gobouta
 Gonon
 Gota
 Gou
 Goueke
 Gounangalay
 Gpagalai
 Guela
 Guelabodiou
 Hoota
 Kabieta
 Kankore
 Karagouala
 Karana
 Kelema
 Kelemadiou
 Keora
 Keoulenta
 Kerediala
 Kleita
 Koaliepoulou
 Kodeda
 Kogbata
 Kogoloue
 Kola
 Kolagbata
 Kolata
 Koliouata
 Koloda
 Komata
 Komou
 Koni
 Konia
 Konian
 Konigpala
 Koola
 Koro
 Kotodzou
 Kouenala
 Koule
 Lokooua
 Lomou
 Louhoule
 Loula
 Loule
 Mabossou
 Mana
 Mananko
 Meata
 Moata
 Ngnin
 Niambala
 Niaragbaleye
 Niaragpale
 Niema
 Ninata
 Nionta
 Noona
 Nzao
 Orata
 Oueya
 Ouinzou
 Pineta
 Poe
 Pouro
 Samoe
 Saouro
 Sehipa
 Selo
 Sibamou
 Sopota
 Souhoule
 Soulouta
 Yalenzou
 Yeneta
 Yleouena
 Yogbota
 Yomou
 Youa
 Zapa
 Zenemouta
 Zohoyea

External links
Maplandia

Prefectures of Guinea
Nzérékoré Region